Sarkot-e Sheyni (also Romanized as Sarkot-e Sheynī; also known as Sarkot-e Shehnī and Sarkūt-e Sheynī) is a village in Tolbozan Rural District, Golgir District, Masjed Soleyman County, Khuzestan Province, Iran. At the 2006 census, its population was 68, in 11 families.

References 

Populated places in Masjed Soleyman County